Artapanus, also spelled Artapanas, may refer to:

Artapanus (General), Persian general  under Xerxes who fought at the Battle of Thermopylae
Artapanus of Alexandria, Jewish historian believed to have lived in Alexandria